José Francisco de Morais (1950–1999) was a Brazilian footballer.  He played for Uberlândia and Cruzeiro, scoring 2 goals for the latter in their 1977 Copa Libertadores campaign.

References

1950 births
1999 deaths
Brazilian footballers
1975 Copa América players
Cruzeiro Esporte Clube players
Esporte Clube Democrata players
Uberlândia Esporte Clube players
Association footballers not categorized by position